Konstantinos "Kostas" Tsartsaris (born October 17, 1979 in Veria, Greece), is a former Greek professional basketball player and coach, who spent most of his playing career with the Greek League team Panathinaikos. At 6 ft 10  in (2.10 m) tall and 115.4 kg (255 lb.) in weight, he played at the mainly at the power forward position, but he could also play at the center position, if needed.

Professional career
Tsartsaris was first noticed by professional Greek clubs as a wonder kid, when he was playing in the lower divisions for the team of Filippos Verias. Because Filippos did not allow him to move to another Greek club, he chose at the age of 17 to play for Úrvalsdeild karla club U.M.F. Grindavik for the 1997–98 season. Throughout the season, he averaged 20.7 points, 11.3 rebounds, and 4.5 blocks per game.

He returned to Greece in 1998, and he was signed on a free transfer by Near East. The following year, he moved to Peristeri, and in 2002, he moved to Panathinaikos. With Panathinaikos, he was the Greek Cup MVP for 3 consecutive years (2006, 2007, 2008).

In June 2013, after conquering the double in Greece, by winning both the Greek League and Greek Cup in the same season, Tsartsaris announced his decision to finish his playing career, after wearing Panathinaikos' jersey for 11 successful years.

National team career
Tsartsaris was a member of the senior men's Greek national basketball team that won the gold medal at the 2005 EuroBasket and the silver medal at the 2006 FIBA World Championship. He also played at the 2004 Summer Olympics, the 2007 EuroBasket, the 2008 Summer Olympics, and the 2010 FIBA World Championship.

Coaching career
Tsartsaris began his coaching career in 2014, working at the young cadet academy school level. On April 21, 2016, it was revealed that Tsartsaris would become an assistant coach of Argyris Pedoulakis, with Panathinaikos.

Career statistics

EuroLeague

|-
| style="text-align:left;"| 2000–01
| style="text-align:left;" rowspan=2| Peristeri
| 11 || 9 || 31.0 || .536 || .440 || .784 || 6.2 || 1.9 || .5 || .3 || 11.1 || 13.5
|-
| style="text-align:left;"| 2001–02
| 14 || 12 || 29.3 || .522 || .143 || .645 || 6.3 || 1.7 || 1.0 || .6 || 10.2 || 11.9
|-
| style="text-align:left;"| 2002-03
| style="text-align:left;" rowspan=11| Panathinaikos
| 19 || 6 || 12.2 || .688 || .333 || .609 || 2.2 || .4 || .3 || .3 || 4.5 || 4.6
|-
| style="text-align:left;"| 2003–04
| 20 || 13 || 21.4 || .607 || .286 || .707 || 5.2 || .9 || .7 || .4 || 8.8 || 9.8
|-
| style="text-align:left;"| 2004–05
| 25 || 21 || 19.1 || .588 || .364 || .646 || 4.3 || .8 || .6 || .4 || 7.7 || 8.3
|-
| style="text-align:left;"| 2005–06
| 23 || 21 || 18.2 || .485 || .463 || .667 || 3.0 || 1.0 || .5 || .4 || 6.6 || 6.3
|-
| style="text-align:left;background:#AFE6BA;"| 2006–07†
| 23 || 15 || 19.1 || .564 || .244 || .694 || 4.5 || 1.3 || .6 || .5 || 6.6 || 7.5
|-
| style="text-align:left;"| 2007–08
| 12 || 7 || 16.3 || .655 || .444 || .957 || 3.4 || .9 || .2 || .3 || 8.0 || 10.0
|-
| style="text-align:left;background:#AFE6BA;"| 2008–09†
| 19 || 12 || 13.1 || .462 || .286 || .542 || 3.4 || .5 || .6 || .3 || 3.5 || 4.3
|-
| style="text-align:left;"| 2009–10
| 6 || 1 || 13.1 || .364 || .333 || 1.000 || 2.7 || .8 || .2 || .2 || 2.7 || 3.3
|-
| style="text-align:left;background:#AFE6BA;"| 2010–11†
| 22 || 8 || 15.4 || .638 || .294 || .767 || 3.0 || .6 || .6 || .2 || 5.5 || 5.5
|-
| style="text-align:left;"| 2011–12
| 17 || 2 || 14.2 || .475 || .231 || .800 || 2.7 || .5 || .4 || .2 || 4.2 || 4.1
|-
| style="text-align:left;"| 2012–13
| 28 || 10 || 18.2 || .542 || .222 || .585 || 3.1 || .9 || .4 || .1 || 3.8 || 3.6
|- class="sortbottom"
| align="center" colspan="2"| Career
| 239 || 137 || ? || .562 || .320 || .693 || 3.8 || .9 || .5 || .3 || 6.3 || ?

Awards and accomplishments

Pro playing career
 Icelandic Cup Winner: (1998)
 Greek League Best Young Player: (1999)
 7× Greek League All-Star: (2001, 2002, 2004, 2005, 2006, 2007, 2008)
 10× Greek League Champion: (2003, 2004, 2005, 2006, 2007, 2008, 2009, 2010, 2011, 2013)
 8× Greek Cup Winner: (2003, 2005, 2006, 2007, 2008, 2009, 2012, 2013)
 Greek League Best Five: (2004)
 3× Greek Cup MVP: (2006, 2007, 2008)
 Greek Cup Finals Top Scorer: (2007)
 3× EuroLeague champion: (2007, 2009, 2011)
 2× Triple Crown Winner: (2007, 2009)
 Professional Greek League all-time leader in total rebounds

Greek senior national team
 6× Acropolis Tournament Champion: (2002, 2005, 2006, 2007, 2008, 2010)
 2005 EuroBasket: 
 2006 FIBA Stanković World Cup: 
 2006 FIBA World Championship: 
 2008 FIBA World OQT:

References

External links
 Euroleague.net Profile
 FIBA Profile
 Eurobasket.com Profile
 Draftexpress.com Kostas Tsartsaris' Stats
 Greek Basket League Profile 
 Hellenic Basketball Federation Profile 
 Konstantinos Tsartsaris: Úrvalsdeild career

1979 births
Living people
Basketball players at the 2004 Summer Olympics
2006 FIBA World Championship players
Basketball players at the 2008 Summer Olympics
2010 FIBA World Championship players
Centers (basketball)
FIBA EuroBasket-winning players
Greek Basket League players
Greek basketball coaches
Greek expatriate basketball people in Iceland
Greek Macedonians
Greek men's basketball players
Grindavík men's basketball players
Near East B.C. players
Olympic basketball players of Greece
Panathinaikos B.C. non-playing staff
Panathinaikos B.C. players
Sportspeople from Veria
Peristeri B.C. players
Power forwards (basketball)
Úrvalsdeild karla (basketball) players